Dan Olesevich (September 16, 1937 – July 15, 1983) was a Canadian professional ice hockey goaltender who played in one National Hockey League game for the New York Rangers during the 1961–62 season, on October 21, 1961 against the Detroit Red Wings. The rest of his career, which lasted from 1957 to 1962, was spent in the minor leagues.

Career statistics

Regular season and playoffs

See also
 List of players who played only one game in the NHL

References

External links
 

1937 births
1983 deaths
Accidental deaths in Ontario
Canadian ice hockey goaltenders
Charlotte Clippers players
Edmonton Oil Kings (WCHL) players
Hamilton Tiger Cubs players
Ice hockey people from Ontario
Johnstown Jets players
New York Rangers players
Ontario Hockey Association Senior A League (1890–1979) players
People from Port Colborne
Road incident deaths in Canada